The Northern Maori by-election of 1963 was a by-election for the electorate of Northern Maori on 16 March 1963 during the 33rd New Zealand Parliament. The by-election resulted from the death of the previous member Tapihana Paikea on 7 January 1963.

The by-election was won by Matiu Rata, also of the Labour Party. The by-election was contested by nine candidates, including James Henare who had stood for the National Party several times previously.

The by-election was the closest National has come to winning a Maori seat since 1943, although National's Auckland division did not appreciate the opportunity with a Henare descendant and support from Ngati Whatua, and gave little money and backing to their candidate; for which they were later criticised by the "more astute" South Auckland and Wellington Division leaders. Henare still got the largest swing to National in a by-election in the party's history, with Labour having only a 447-vote majority compared with 3,372 at the previous general election. And over the next 20 years, National's vote in the four Maori seats shrunk to about ten percent, similar to the Social Credit vote.

Results
The following table gives the election results:

Notes

References

Northern Maori 1963
1963 elections in New Zealand
Māori politics
March 1963 events in New Zealand